is a Japanese josei manga magazine published by Shogakukan.  Many series in this anthology magazine are romance-oriented and some are well known for featuring frank depiction of sexual situations. It is also the first josei manga magazine, making its debut in 1977 and being a pioneer in the genre. This magazine is occasionally referred to by its abbreviated form, PuchiComi.

Notable manga artists and series featured in Petit Comic
 Kazumi Kazui
 Dōse Mō Nigerarenai
 Enjōji Maki
Hapi Mari
An Incurable Case of Love
Tsumari Sukitte Iitain dakedo
 Chie Shinohara
Kioku no Ashiato
 Yuki Yoshihara
Butterflies, Flowers
 Akemi Yoshimura
Bara no Tame ni
 Ohmi Tomu
Midnight Secretary

References

External links
Official Petit Comic website 

1977 establishments in Japan
Josei manga magazines
Magazines established in 1977
Magazines published in Tokyo
Monthly manga magazines published in Japan
Shogakukan magazines